Malone v United Kingdom [1984] ECHR 10 is a UK constitutional law case, concerning the rule of law.

Facts
James Malone, an antique dealer in Dorking, claimed that intercepting his telephone conversations, on authority of a warrant by the Secretary of State for Home Affairs, was unlawful, and asked for an injunction against the Metropolitan Police Commissioner for monitoring his telephone. There was no overall statutory code governing interception of communications, although the Post Office Act 1969 Schedule 5, para 1, stated that it was an offence to interfere in post or telephone communications unless "the act constituting the offence was done in obedience to a warrant under the hand of a Secretary of State." Malone was charged with handling stolen property, namely around £10,000 in UK, US and Italian banknotes and a grandfather clock. The prosecution admitted that evidence was from phone tapping. Malone argued that (1) even with a warrant the Home Secretary could not monitor confidential conversations without consent, (2) Malone had a right of property, privacy and confidentiality in conversations, and (3) that the interception violated ECHR article 8, ‘respect for his private and family life, his home and his correspondence’. The Metropolitan Police argued there was no remedy in English law for monitoring and disclosure of the conversations, and no remedy for breach of human rights. After losing the High Court judgment, Malone ultimately appealed to the European Court of Human Rights.

Judgment

High Court
Sir Robert Megarry VC held that the European Convention on Human Rights was not justiciable in England, and therefore Article 8 of the convention created no legal or equitable right. When tapping was done for crime prevention by the Post Office for police, there was no law against it. Tapping on the warrant of the Home Secretary was effective in law. Unlike searches and seizures involving trespass, there was no immunity based on a property right (except copyright) in telephone conversations, and no general right of privacy at common law or under the Wireless Telegraphy Act 1949 section 5, which related only to unauthorised interceptions. Nor did Malone have any contractual right of confidentiality from telephones, and breach of any confidentiality right was excused for detecting or preventing crime. In any case the Post Office intercepted the messages, so a claim against the Metropolitan Police would fail in its entirety. A matter so complex as phone tapping was for Parliament, not the Courts. Megarry VC remarked that the situation in English law compared very unfavourably to West Germany, exemplified by the Klass case, and cried out for legislation, which would be compatible with the Convention. In the course of his judgment he said the following:

European Court of Human Rights
The European Court of Human Rights held that the UK allowing the phone tapping was in breach of its obligations under ECHR article 8, because there was no express law that indicated "with reasonable clarity the scope and manner of exercise of the relevant discretion conferred on the public authorities." There was an interference with article 8, which was not justified because phone tapping was not "in accordance with the law". This required adequate clarity about circumstances in which one's communications may be intercepted.

Significance
After the Malone decision, Parliament passed the Interception of Communications Act 1985 allowing any phone tapping with a warrant. In the Regulation of Investigatory Powers Act 2000 sections 1-11 recast the rules on the interceptions of communications with a warrant. The Data Retention and Investigatory Powers Act 2014 made more amendments, enabling also widespread powers to intercept and store internet communications. In R (David Davis MP and Tom Watson MP) v Secretary of State for the Home Department (2015) an action for judicial review challenged DRIPA 2014 as being against the Human Rights Act 1998 and the CFREU. In turn the Investigatory Powers Act 2016 updated DRIPA 2014, but was named the "Snooper's Charter" in the media for the virtually unlimited powers of surveillance. It passed Parliament using Conservative votes, while Labour abstained, and the Liberal Democrats voted against. It allows public bodies to access internet records without a warrant. In 2016, the Court of Justice of the European Union held that general retention of data is unlawful, meaning that under EU law (as almost certainly under the European Convention) such mass surveillance is unlawful.

R (Fewings) v Somerset CC disapproved the view of Megarry VC that not every government act requires legal authority.

See also

United Kingdom constitutional law
R (Daly) v Secretary of State for the Home Department [2001] UKHL 26... which concerned a policy that prisoners must be absent from their cells when legal correspondence kept there was examined. Lord Bingham of Cornhill, with whose speech the other members of the House agreed, summarised the effect of the earlier authorities concerning prisoners, including Ex parte Leech: "Among the rights which, in part at least, survive [imprisonment] are three important rights, closely related but free standing, each of them calling for appropriate legal protection: the right of access to a court; the right of access to legal advice; and the right to communicate confidentially with a legal adviser under the seal of legal professional privilege. Such rights may be curtailed only by clear and express words, and then only to the extent reasonably necessary to meet the ends which justify the curtailment."

Notes

References

United Kingdom constitutional case law